Cerro de la Muerte is a mountain peak of a massif in Costa Rica, it is located within the Tapantí — Cerro de la Muerte Massif National Park, and is the highest point on the Pan-American Highway.

Toponymy
Its name means  "Mountain of Death", "Hill of Death" or "Summit of Death," since in the past crossing the mountains from the Valle Central meant a three- or four-day journey, on foot or on horseback, and many ill-prepared travelers succumbed to the cold and rain. However, the peak is now easily accessible since the Route 2 runs close by.

Description
A drivable track from the highway (Kilometer 89) leads to a peak, with its cluster of telecommunications aerials. A short hike is also available from the highway to another peak marked with a barrel. At this altitude, overnight temperatures can dip below freezing, but the sun soon raises the temperatures in the morning, with a high risk of sunburn in the thin clear air. Record temperatures reach below -6°C. 

This mountain is in Talamanca range, which extends from eastern Costa Rica into neighboring western Panama. This range was a volcanic island in the geological past, it raised result of tectonic uplift and its separation from other mountain ranges means that it has developed many endemic species of animals and plants, often with affinities to Andean forms.

The higher areas are páramo habitat, with stunted shrubs, dwarf bamboo, and tree ferns, and smaller plants like blueberry, gooseberry and lady's slipper. Below this zone, the natural vegetation is oak forest with bamboo understory, an excellent place to see the charismatic resplendent quetzal.

Nearly 50% of the bird species recorded from Cerro de la Muerte are  endemic to  the Talamanca range.  These include fiery-throated hummingbird, timberline wren, sooty robin, black-billed nightingale-thrush, peg-billed finch and volcano junco.

Crossing Cerro de la Muerte 

Because crossing Cerro de la Muerte took up to five days on foot, at the beginning of the twentieth century, three resting stations were created by Congressional Decree Number 45, signed on 5 August 1908.

Between 1910 and 1912, the three resting stops, known as houses, were built; "División", "La Muerte" and "Ojo de Agua", at a cost of ₡1,749.47.  They were built at intervals of about 10 to 12 hours of hiking from each other. There was a rule of leaving firewood ready for the next guest. 

In 1990, the Ministry of Culture recognized the importance of the resting stop houses, and in 20 November 2016 the "Casa Refugio Ojo de Agua" was restored and is now a small museum.

See also
Cerro de la Muerte Biological Station

References

External links
 Helicopter crashes in Cerro de la Muerte, La Nación  

Muerte